The Federal Service for Intellectual Property, commonly known as Rospatent, is a Russian governmental agency in charge of intellectual property. Its former name was "Federal Service for Intellectual Property, Patents and Trademarks (Rospatent)".

In the former Soviet Union, Goskomizobretenie, which stood for Gosudarstvennyi komitet po delam izobretenie i otkrytii, was the State Committee for Inventions and Discoveries. It maintained a registry of inventions and discoveries and gave out authors certificates and patents.

As of August 1, 2020, 476,905 national trademarks and 220,513 international trademarks were registered at the Russian Federal Service for Intellectual Property, and it issued 266,104 patents.

References

External links
 Official website
 

Government agencies of Russia
Patent offices
Russian intellectual property law
International Searching and Preliminary Examining Authorities